Mueller–Hinton agar is a microbiological growth medium that is commonly used for antibiotic susceptibility testing, specifically disk diffusion tests.  It is also used to isolate and maintain Neisseria and Moraxella species.

It typically contains:
2.0 g beef extract
17.5 g casein hydrolysate
1.5 g starch
17.0 g agar
1 liter of distilled water.
pH adjusted to neutral at 25 °C.

Five percent sheep's blood and nicotinamide adenine dinucleotide may also be added when susceptibility testing is done on Streptococcus and Campylobacter species.

It has a few properties that make it excellent for antibiotic use. First of all, it is a nonselective, nondifferential medium. This means that almost all organisms plated on it will grow. Additionally, it contains starch. Starch is known to absorb toxins released from bacteria, so that they cannot interfere with the antibiotics. Second, it is a loose agar. This allows for better diffusion of the antibiotics than most other plates. A better diffusion leads to a truer zone of inhibition.

Mueller–Hinton agar was co-developed by a microbiologist John Howard Mueller and a veterinary scientist Jane Hinton at Harvard University as a culture for gonococcus and meningococcus. They co-published the method in 1941.

References

Microbiological media
Cell culture media